Cheikhou Omar Ben Tall (born 2 July 1993), commonly known as Omar Tall, is a Senegalese-born, American soccer player who plays as a midfielder for Ogniwo Sopot.

Career
Born in Senegal, Tall moved to America as a child and played soccer for Woodlands High School. He enrolled at the University of Hartford and played for their soccer team from 2011 to 2014.

He joined American Soccer League side Connecticut United in 2016, and was loaned to Polish I liga side Stal Mielec later the same year. He returned to America in early 2017, having made two league appearances in Poland. In 2021 he signed with a fourth league club GKS Cartusia.

Career statistics

Club

Notes

References

1993 births
Living people
Association football forwards
American soccer players
American expatriate soccer players
Hartford Hawks men's soccer players
Stal Mielec players
I liga players
III liga players
American expatriate sportspeople in Poland
Expatriate footballers in Poland
Senegalese emigrants to the United States
Footballers from Dakar